, stylized as Yu-Gi-Oh! ZEXAL, is a Japanese manga and anime series and the fourth main series of the Yu-Gi-Oh! franchise, after the preceding Yu-Gi-Oh! 5D's. The manga began serialization in Shueisha's V Jump magazine from December 2010 to June 2015 and is licensed in North America by Viz Media. The anime series was produced by Nihon Ad Systems and TV Tokyo, and its animation was done by Gallop. It aired on TV Tokyo from April 2011 to September 2012, with an English-language version airing in North America between October 2011 and August 2013. A sequel series, titled , aired in Japan from October 2012 to March 2014 and in North America from June 2013 to January 2016. 

The series aired on The CW as part of the Toonzai and, later, Vortexx Saturday morning blocks. The series was later broadcast on Nicktoons starting April 12, 2013. After Vortexx ended, new episodes were streamed to Hulu beginning July 14, 2014. In Canada, the series aired on YTV starting June 2, 2012, while new episodes of Zexal II moved to Teletoon on May 4, 2014.

The series was succeeded by Yu-Gi-Oh! Arc-V.

Plot and setting

Taking place in the near future in a place called Heartland City, the story focuses on Yuma Tsukumo, a young duelist who strives to become the Duel Monsters champion, despite being an amateur. One day, during a duel with a rival named Shark, a mysterious spirit called Astral appears before him, and helps him to win. Astral explains to Yuma he is searching for his lost memories, which have been transformed into 100  cards called , which have been scattered across the globe. The Numbers have the ability to possess the duelists who own them, and bring out their darkest desires. In order to recover his memories, Astral teams up with Yuma to recover the Number cards. Entering the World Duel Carnival tournament, Yuma finds himself up against various rivals, including the vengeance-seeking Vetrix and the maniacal Dr. Faker, who wants the Numbers for their own gain.

Yu-Gi-Oh! Zexal II takes place right after the end of the first series. In this new story, as the curtain falls on the World Duel Carnival, peace has finally returned to Heartland City. But now, forces from Barian World, a world hostile to Astral's World, are aiming at taking the "Numbers" and Astral for themselves. In order to protect Astral, Yuma, Kite, and Shark stand together to combat the Barian threat.

The gameplay gimmick introduced in Zexal is AR Duels (Augmented Reality Duels), in which both players utilize a head-mounted device known as a Duel Gazer to observe a virtual reality where the Duel Monsters interact with the environment.

Media

Manga
A manga series written by Shin Yoshida and illustrated by Naohito Miyoshi began serialization in the extended February 2011 issue of Shueisha's V Jump magazine, released on December 18, 2010. The first bound volume was released in Japan on June 3, 2011. Viz Media licensed the manga in North America and began releasing the series from June 5, 2012. The manga also began serialization on the digital Shonen Jump Alpha from July 9, 2012. A spin-off manga written by Akihiro Tomonaga and illustrated by Wedge Holdings, titled , was serialized in Shueisha's Saikyō Jump magazine from April 2012 to April 2014.

Anime

The anime was first teased on December 9, 2010, revealing details would be unveiled at the Japanese encore screening of Yu-Gi-Oh! 3D: Bonds Beyond Time on February 20, 2011. The series' name was revealed on December 13, 2010, via a leak from the February 2011 issue of V Jump.  It was revealed that Satoshi Kuwahara would be the director, that scripts would be supervised by Shin Yoshida, that Masahiro Hikokubo would choreograph the duels, and that Hirotoshi Takaya would adapt the character designs for the anime. A one-minute promotional video was released on December 17, 2010. The anime aired on TV Tokyo between April 11, 2011 and September 24, 2012. A second series titled Yu-Gi-Oh! Zexal II aired between October 7, 2012 and March 23, 2014 in a different time slot. Overall with both seasons, the total number of episodes are 146, plus 3 specials.

An English adaptation by 4Kids Entertainment premiered on October 15, 2011 on Toonzai. Although, TV Tokyo and Nihon Ad Systems filed a lawsuit against 4Kids Entertainment and demanded the termination of the Yu-Gi-Oh! licensing agreement with them in March 2011, a stay of proceedings was ordered preventing the termination of the contract or the resale of the franchise until a ruling was decided. Following the bankruptcy of 4Kids, all Yu-Gi-Oh! assets were acquired by Konami's subsidiary, Konami Cross Media NY (which at the time was named 4K Media Inc.). The series aired on Saban Brands' Vortexx block until it dissolved on September 27, 2014 and aired on Nicktoons from April 12, 2013. Episodes from #114 onwards were streamed on Hulu. Ultra Kidz premiered the series in the United States with Latin American Spanish dubbing on June 1, 2018.

Music

There are five official soundtrack CDs, all released by Marvelous Entertainment.
 The first, Yu-Gi-Oh! Zexal Sound Duel 1, was released on September 28, 2011.
 The second, Yu-Gi-Oh! Zexal Sound Duel 2, was released on September 19, 2012.
 The third, Yu-Gi-Oh! Zexal Sound Duel 3, was released on May 15, 2013.
 The fourth, Yu-Gi-Oh! Zexal Sound Duel 4, was released on November 13, 2013.
 The fifth, Yu-Gi-Oh! Zexal Sound Duel 5, was released on November 19, 2014.

Opening Themes
  by mihimaru GT (Eps 1–25, Ep 146 ending)
  by Kanan (Eps 26–49)
  by Color Bottle (Eps 50–73)
Second season
  by Hideaki Takatori (Eps 74–98)
  by Petit Milady (Aoi Yuki and Ayana Taketatsu) (Eps 99–123)
  by Diamond☆Yukai (Eps 124–145)

Ending Themes
  by Golden Bomber (Eps 1–25)
  by DaizyStripper (Eps 26–49)
  by Moumoon (Eps 50–73)
Second season
  by Vistlip (Eps 74–98)
  by FoZZtone (Eps 99–123)
  by REDMAN (Eps 124–145)

English Opening Theme
 "Take a Chance" by Michael Brady, Shane Guenego, Arthur Murakami, & Surefire Music Group (Eps 1–73)
 "Halfway to Forever" by Michael Brady, Shane Guenego, Arthur Murakami, Jonathan Lattif, & Surefire Music Group (Eps 74–146)

Trading Card Game

Yu-Gi-Oh! Zexal added new gameplay elements to the Yu-Gi-Oh! Trading Card Game, in which Master Rule 2 came into effect by introducing the XYZ Monsters into the game. These black-colored cards do not have levels, but are categorized by Ranks, which are located on the opposite end of where the Levels were. XYZ Monsters are summoned from the Extra Deck by stacking multiple monsters on the field of the same level on top of each other and placing the desired XYZ Monster whose Rank is the same as the two stacked monsters' levels. During gameplay, the stacked materials become "XYZ Materials", or "Overlay Units", which are used to trigger the XYZ Monster's effects by being sent to the graveyard.

Video game
A video game based on the series titled  was developed by Konami and released in Japan for the Nintendo 3DS on December 5, 2013. It was released as Yu-Gi-Oh! Zexal: World Duel Carnival in North America on September 25, 2014.

References

External links

  
 

2011 anime television series debuts
2011 manga
2012 manga
2012 anime television series debuts
Adventure anime and manga
Anime spin-offs
Augmented reality in fiction
Comics based on television series
Fantasy anime and manga
Gallop (studio)
Shōnen manga
Shueisha franchises
Shueisha manga
TV Tokyo original programming
Viz Media manga
Yu-Gi-Oh!
Yu-Gi-Oh!-related anime